Brooklyn 11223  is an American reality television series that premiered on Oxygen on March 26, 2012. The series, set in Bay Ridge, Brooklyn and follows the lives of a group of twelve Italian-American men and women in their mid-20s. The series was picked up by MTV Canada and premiered on June 4, 2012.

Episodes

Cast

References

External links

2010s American reality television series
2012 American television series debuts
2012 American television series endings
English-language television shows
Oxygen (TV channel) original programming